Life Light Up is the first studio album from contemporary Christian music artist Christy Nockels, released on June 2, 2009, by Sparrow Records and sixstepsrecords.

Critical reception

Allmusic's James Christopher Monger said the album "an elegant collection of polished, faith-based folk-pop that retains Watermark's country roots while introducing a more contemporary, radio-ready production style."

CCM Magazines Jackie A. Chapman said "Chris Tomlin has said that Christy Nockels is his favorite vocalist, and it’s not difficult to imagine after listening to Life Light Up. Her voice is as pure as it is powerful, beautifully matching the spirit of each song. Moreover, her convincing performances are boosted by arrangements and production that make them feel like a live event."  Chapman wrote the album "takes her work as a worship leader to a brand-new level."

Christian Music Review's Kevin Davis said "this is my favorite female solo album of the year along with Lanae' Hale's Back & Forth."

CMSpin's C.W. Ross said "this is a really well done release that works well in all aspects, but it's the stellar vocals from Christy Nockels that move it up to the next level of goodness."

Jesus Freak Hideout's Roger Gelwicks said the album "is for the most part a rewarding listen and is a welcomed addition to the list of 2009's comeback artists."

Louder Than the Music's Suzanne Physick said "I honestly don't think I could praise this album enough because I do believe it is one of the strongest albums I have heard in a long time and hopefully won't be the last we hear from Christy Nockels."

Track listing

Charts
Album

Singles

References

2009 debut albums
Sparrow Records albums
Christy Nockels albums